Ingrid Chandel Osegueda Chung (born 12 May 1993) is an American-born Salvadoran footballer who plays as a forward. She has been a member of El Salvador women's national team.

Early life
Osegueda was born in Los Angeles County, California, raised in Rowland Heights.

High school and college career
Osegueda has attended the John A. Rowland High School in her hometown, the Rio Hondo College in Rose Hills and the University of Antelope Valley in Lancaster.

International career
Osegueda capped for El Salvador at senior level during the 2017 Central American Games.

International goals
Scores and results list El Salvador's goal tally first.

See also
List of El Salvador women's international footballers

References

1993 births
Living people
Citizens of El Salvador through descent
Salvadoran women's footballers
Women's association football forwards
El Salvador women's international footballers
Salvadoran people of Asian descent
Sportspeople from Los Angeles County, California
Soccer players from California
American women's soccer players
College women's soccer players in the United States
American sportspeople of Salvadoran descent